The Woodsman is a 2012 American stage play (described by its creators as a "dramatico-musical") with music composed by Edward W. Hardy, lyrics by Jennifer Loring, and book by James Ortiz. It focuses on the story of the Tin Woodman character from L. Frank Baum's series of books set in the fictional Land of Oz, notably Baum's 1918 book The Tin Woodman of Oz. The production employs live performers, puppets, music, and very few spoken words.

Conceived by Strangemen Theatre Company, Edward W. Hardy and James Ortiz, originally created by James Ortiz & Diana Stahl and produced by Steven Laing & Jason Ralph, the show debuted in 2012 at Standard ToyKraft in Brooklyn, followed by a 2013 run at the Ars Nova ANT Fest.  It has been produced Off-Broadway at 59E59 Theaters in 2014 and 2015, and at New World Stages in 2016. In 2019, a limited run was produced at the Bluebarn Theatre in Omaha, Nebraska.

The play has received critical praise for Hardy's music, and won a 2016 Obie Award for Ortiz's puppet design.  On May 29, 2016, the cast recording of the musical soundtrack was released worldwide. On September 2, 2016, a filmed performance of the work was broadcast by PBS stations, as part of the Theater Close-Up series produced by WNET in association with BroadwayHD. As at February 25, 2022, vocal and violin selections from The Woodsman were published digitally.

Plot
The play focuses on the story of Nick Chopper, a mortal woodsman who falls in love with a young woman whose guardian is the Wicked Witch of the East. (The witch's rule has made everyone afraid to speak aloud, so people mainly communicate in noises.) The witch curses his axe and he begins to lose pieces of himself.  As he falls apart, he is replaced piece by piece with metal, while trying to hold on to his love and identity.

Reception

New York Times critic Laura Collins-Hughes praised the 2015 production, especially for Hardy's music and for Ortiz's puppet design, while noting that the visual, nonverbal storytelling of the hour-long production was not always clear to the audience.  Collins-Hughes found the 2016 production to be less rushed and "more assured", with an increased "visual lushness", but felt that "mechanics get in the way of fantasy" during part of the show. Variety'''s Marilyn Stasio cited the production's "haunting beauty", while Frank Scheck of The Hollywood Reporter described the "charming and disturbing", minimalist production as the antithesis of Wicked'', the massively successful big-budget Oz-based musical playing a block away.

References

External links
 
 
  Edward W. Hardy Publishing

The Woodsman (play)
2012 plays
Obie Award-winning plays
Theatre soundtracks
Compositions by Edward W. Hardy
Films scored by Edward W. Hardy
2016 soundtrack albums
Plays based on The Wizard of Oz
Off-Broadway plays